The Indiana Business Bulletin provides weekly economic analysis, forecasting, and leading economic indicators to the business community, media, and policymakers. The website is published and maintained by the Center for Business and Economic Research in the Miller College of Business at Ball State University.

See also
Center for Business and Economic Research

References

External links
 IBB web site

1994 establishments in Indiana
Business magazines published in the United States
Weekly magazines published in the United States
Magazines published in Indiana
Magazines established in 1994
Newsletters